William de Mandeville (died before 1130)  was an Anglo-Norman baron and Constable of the Tower of London.

Life

William de Mandeville inherited the estates of his father Geoffrey de Mandeville, the Domesday tenant-in-chief, around 1100. He was Constable of the Tower of London at that time, and thus keeper of the first person known to be imprisoned there for political reasons, Ranulf Flambard. Flambard's escape in February 1101 would have significant consequences for William.

It is not known if William was in some way complicit in the escape of Flambard, or was simply a careless keeper. Regardless, as a punishment, in 1103 Henry I confiscated the three richest of William's Essex estates, Sawbridgeworth, Saffron Walden, and Great Waltham, comprising about a third of his entire holdings, as well as the constableship giving them to Eudo Dapifer, William’s father-in-law. Little is known of William's activities after this.

William married Margaret, daughter of Eudo FitzHubert (Dapifer) and Rohese de Clare.  Widowed, Margaret married secondly Othuer fitz Earl (d. 1120), illegitimate son of Hugh d'Avranches, 1st Earl of Chester. William and Margaret's son Geoffrey de Mandeville would recover the seized estates and the constableship during the reign of King Stephen.

Family
 Geoffrey de Mandeville, 1st Earl of Essex (d. 1144)
Beatrice de Mandeville (d. 19 Apr. 1197), married William de Say (d. Aug. 1144). Their granddaughter Beatrice de Say took some of the Mandeville inheritance to her husband, Geoffrey fitz Peter.

References

Additional references

11th-century births
12th-century deaths
Anglo-Normans
People from Essex

Year of birth unknown
Year of death unknown